Holopaw is an American indie band from Gainesville, Florida.  The band was named after the town of Holopaw in Osceola County, Florida, although none of the members of the band have ever lived there.  One of its members, John Orth, collaborated with Modest Mouse frontman Isaac Brock and others in 2002 to release the album Sharpen Your Teeth under the band name Ugly Casanova. Another member, Michael Johnson (Ape School), went on to join Kurt Heasley's Lilys.

History
John Orth and Jeff Hays played as a duo for some time before joining with Michael Johnson, Ryan Gensemer, and Tobi Echevarria as Holopaw for the first two albums.  Johnson, Gensemer and Echevarria relocated to Philadelphia.  Holopaw now consists of Orth, Patrick Quinney, Jeff McMullen, Matt Radick, and Ryan Quinney.

 "depending on when you ask us holopaw is or has been or will be somewhere on the continuum of nothing-comic adaptation-songwriting duo-play a sometime show duo-long distance recordathon-actual record-recording rock band-actual touring rock band with shows in different towns that people come to and everything....right now we’re around the actual recording touring rock band end of that spectrum....well maybe not touring but we’re working on getting back to that...."

Members
 John Orth - Vocals/Artwork 
 Jeff Hays - Guitars/Pedal Steel/Vocals
 Patrick Quinney - Guitars
 Matt Radick - Keyboards/Cello/Guitars
 Jeff McMullen - Bass
 Ryan Quinney - Drums

Discography

Studio albums
Holopaw (Subpop, January 21, 2003)
Quit +/or Fight (Subpop, August 9, 2005)
Oh, Glory. Oh, Wilderness. (Bakery Outlet / Obscurist Press, November 24, 2009)
Academy Songs, Volume 1 (Misra, January 15, 2013)

External links
 Official Website
 Portfolio of John Orth

Indie rock musical groups from Florida
Musical groups from Gainesville, Florida
2001 establishments in Florida
Musical groups established in 2001
Misra Records artists
Sub Pop artists